Wortham is a surname. Notable people with the surname include:

Barron Wortham (born 1969), American football player
Cornelius Wortham (born 1982), American football player
Gus Sessions Wortham (1891–1976), American businessman
John Lee Wortham (1862–1924), American businessman and politician
Rich Wortham (born 1953), American baseball player
Stanton Wortham, American academic